Below are the squads for the men's football tournament at the 1994 Asian Games, played in Hiroshima, Japan.

Group A

Bahrain
Coach:  Ivan Čabrinović

China
Coach: Qi Wusheng

Iran
Coach:  Stanko Poklepović

Turkmenistan
Coach: Täçmyrat Agamyradow

Yemen
Coach:  Humberto Redes

Group B

Hong Kong
Coach:  Koo Luam Khen

Malaysia
Coach:  Claude Le Roy

Saudi Arabia
Coach:  Ivo Wortmann

Thailand
Coach: Chatchai Paholpat

Uzbekistan
Coach: Rustam Akramov

Group C

Kuwait
Coach:  Valeriy Lobanovskyi

Nepal
Coach: Dhan Bahadur Basnet

Oman
Coach:  Heshmat Mohajerani

South Korea
Coach:  Anatoliy Byshovets

Group D

Japan
Coach:  Paulo Roberto Falcão

Myanmar
Coach:  Ger Blok

Qatar
Coach:  Evaristo de Macedo

United Arab Emirates
Coach:  Antoni Piechniczek

References

 Results

External links
Korea Results
Japan RSSSF
China Results

1994
Squads